Alfred Sirven (6 January 1927, in Toulouse – 12 February 2005, in Deauville) was a French businessman.

1927 births
2005 deaths
20th-century French businesspeople
Businesspeople from Toulouse